That Night in London is a 1932 British crime film directed by Rowland V. Lee, produced by Alexander Korda, and written by Dorothy Greenhill and Arthur Wimperis. It stars Robert Donat, Pearl Argyle, Miles Mander and Roy Emerton. It was released in the United States under the alternative title of Over Night.

Premise
A young bank clerk steals £500 and plans to go on a spree before shooting himself  but a bad girl turned good tries to convince him to return the money and stay alive.

Cast
Robert Donat as Dick Warren
Pearl Argyle as Eve Desborough
Miles Mander as Harry Tresham
Roy Emerton as Captain Paulson
Graham Soutten as Bert
Laurence Hanray as Ribbles
Eugene Leahy as Bank Manager
James Knight as Inspector Brody
James Bucton as Inspector Ryan

References

External links

1932 crime films
Films produced by Alexander Korda
British black-and-white films
Films directed by Rowland V. Lee
British crime films
Films set in London
Paramount Pictures films
Films shot at Imperial Studios, Elstree
1930s British films